Robert Oliver Jones (born October 11, 1949) is a former Major League Baseball outfielder and a decorated combat veteran of the Vietnam War. He played all or part of nine seasons in the majors from  until . In November 2013, Bobby Jones became a coach for the Texas Rangers.

Playing career
Jones was drafted by the Washington Senators in the 36th round of the 1967 Major League Baseball Draft. He spent the next seven seasons with the organization, during which time they became the Texas Rangers, and debuted in the major leagues with them. During the  season, the Rangers waived him, and he was claimed by the California Angels, for whom he played two seasons. He was released by the Angels before the  season, and he signed with the Chunichi Dragons, for whom he played two seasons as well.

Coaching/managerial career
Since his retirement, Jones has continued to be employed within the Rangers organization. He also won a league championship with the Tulsa Drillers. In , he managed the Triple-A Oklahoma City RedHawks.

Jones is the 89ers/RedHawks franchise's winningest manager (568 wins through 2008) and is the Rangers' all-time minor league leader with 1,285 victories (through 2008). He was also presented the 2008 Mike Coolbaugh Award for "outstanding baseball work ethic, knowledge of the game, and skill in mentoring young players on the field."

Military career

Jones is one of the few baseball players who served on active duty in the United States Army in the Vietnam Era. From December 1969 to February 1971, he was in Vietnam at Firebase Siberia, where he eventually reached the rank of Corporal and earned the Bronze Star Medal in February 1971. He had the medal officially presented to him by a senior military officer in a pregame Patriot Day ceremony on September 11, 2014 at Globe Life Park while he served as Assistant Hitting Coach with the Texas Rangers.

References

External links

1949 births
Living people
American expatriate baseball players in Japan
Anderson Senators players
Baseball players from Maryland
Burlington Senators players
California Angels players
Chunichi Dragons players
Denver Bears players
Fort Myers Sun Sox players
Geneva Senators players
Major League Baseball first base coaches
Major League Baseball outfielders
Major League Baseball third base coaches
Minor league baseball managers
Oklahoma City 89ers players
Sacramento Solons players
Salisbury Senators players
Salt Lake City Gulls players
Shelby Senators players
Spokane Indians players
Texas Rangers coaches
Texas Rangers players
Tulsa Drillers players
Wichita Aeros players
United States Army personnel of the Vietnam War
People from Elkton, Maryland